The 94th Academy Awards ceremony, presented by the Academy of Motion Picture Arts and Sciences (AMPAS), took place on March 27, 2022, at the Dolby Theatre in Hollywood, Los Angeles. The awards were scheduled after their usual late February date to avoid conflicting with both the 2022 Winter Olympics and Super Bowl LVI, with the latter being held in nearby Inglewood, California. During the gala, the AMPAS presented Academy Awards (commonly referred to as Oscars) in 23 categories honoring films released from March 1 to December 31, 2021. The ceremony, televised in the United States by ABC, was produced by Will Packer and Shayla Cowan and was directed by Glenn Weiss. Actresses Regina Hall, Amy Schumer, and Wanda Sykes hosted the show for the first time. Two days earlier, in an event held at the Ray Dolby Ballroom of the Ovation Hollywood complex in Hollywood, the Academy held its 12th annual Governors Awards ceremony.

CODA won three awards, including Best Picture. Other winners included Dune with six awards, The Eyes of Tammy Faye with two, and Belfast, Cruella, Drive My Car, Encanto, King Richard, The Long Goodbye, No Time to Die, The Power of the Dog, The Queen of Basketball, Summer of Soul, West Side Story and The Windshield Wiper with one. The telecast garnered 16.62 million viewers in the United States.

Winners and nominees 

The nominees for the 94th Academy Awards were announced on February 8, 2022, by actors Leslie Jordan and Tracee Ellis Ross. The Power of the Dog led all nominees with twelve nominations; Dune came in second with ten. The winners were announced during the awards ceremony on March 27.

CODA became the first Best Picture winner to be distributed via a streaming platform and the first one starring a primarily deaf cast. Its three nominations were the fewest for any Best Picture winner since 1932's Grand Hotel, and it was the first Best Picture winner without directing or film editing nominations since the aforementioned film. Furthermore, it became the first without any nominations in the below-the-line categories since 1980's Ordinary People. Best Director winner Jane Campion was the third woman to win the award and the first woman to be nominated twice, having previously been nominated for 1993's The Piano. The Power of the Dog became the first film to win Best Director as its sole award since 1967's The Graduate. Best Original Screenplay winner Kenneth Branagh was the first person to have been nominated in seven different categories throughout his career, having also been nominated as one of the producers for Belfast.

Best Supporting Actor winner Troy Kotsur became the first deaf man and second deaf individual overall to win an acting award. Best Supporting Actress winner Ariana DeBose was the first Afro-Latina person and first openly queer woman of color to win an acting Oscar. Furthermore, as a result of her win for portraying Anita in the 2021 film adaptation of the Broadway musical West Side Story, she and Rita Moreno, who previously won for playing the same character in the 1961 film adaptation, became the third pair of actors to win for portraying the same character in two different films. Nominated for their performances as Leda Caruso in The Lost Daughter, Best Actress nominee Olivia Colman and Best Supporting Actress nominee Jessie Buckley were the third pair of actresses nominated for portraying the same character in the same film. Flee became the first film to be nominated for Best Animated Feature, Best International Feature Film, and Best Documentary Feature in the same year.

Awards

Winners are listed first, highlighted in boldface, and indicated with a double dagger (‡).

{| class="wikitable" role="presentation"
| style="vertical-align:top; width:50%;"| 
 CODA – Philippe Rousselet, Fabrice Gianfermi and Patrick Wachsberger, producers Belfast – Laura Berwick, Kenneth Branagh, Becca Kovacik and Tamar Thomas, producers
 Don't Look Up – Adam McKay and Kevin Messick, producers
 Drive My Car – Teruhisa Yamamoto, producer
 Dune – Mary Parent, Denis Villeneuve and Cale Boyter, producers
 King Richard – Tim White, Trevor White and Will Smith, producers
 Licorice Pizza – Sara Murphy, Adam Somner and Paul Thomas Anderson, producers
 Nightmare Alley – Guillermo del Toro, J. Miles Dale and Bradley Cooper, producers
 The Power of the Dog – Jane Campion, Tanya Seghatchian, Emile Sherman, Iain Canning and Roger Frappier, producers
 West Side Story – Steven Spielberg and Kristie Macosko Krieger, producers
| style="vertical-align:top; width:50%;"| 
 Jane Campion – The Power of the Dog
 Kenneth Branagh – Belfast
 Ryusuke Hamaguchi – Drive My Car
 Paul Thomas Anderson – Licorice Pizza
 Steven Spielberg – West Side Story
|-
| style="vertical-align:top; width:50%;"| 
 Will Smith – King Richard as Richard Williams
 Javier Bardem – Being the Ricardos as Desi Arnaz
 Benedict Cumberbatch – The Power of the Dog as Phil Burbank
 Andrew Garfield – Tick, Tick... Boom! as Jonathan Larson
 Denzel Washington – The Tragedy of Macbeth as Lord Macbeth
| style="vertical-align:top; width:50%;"| 
 Jessica Chastain – The Eyes of Tammy Faye as Tammy Faye Bakker
 Olivia Colman – The Lost Daughter as Leda Caruso
 Penélope Cruz – Parallel Mothers as Janis Martínez Moreno
 Nicole Kidman – Being the Ricardos as Lucille Ball
 Kristen Stewart – Spencer as Diana Spencer
|-
| style="vertical-align:top; width:50%;"| 
 Troy Kotsur – CODA as Frank Rossi
 Ciarán Hinds – Belfast as Pop
 Jesse Plemons – The Power of the Dog as George Burbank
 J. K. Simmons – Being the Ricardos as William Frawley
 Kodi Smit-McPhee – The Power of the Dog as Peter Gordon
| style="vertical-align:top; width:50%;"| 
 Ariana DeBose – West Side Story as Anita
 Jessie Buckley – The Lost Daughter as young Leda Caruso
 Judi Dench – Belfast as Granny
 Kirsten Dunst – The Power of the Dog as Rose Gordon
 Aunjanue Ellis – King Richard as Oracene "Brandy" Price
|-
| style="vertical-align:top; width:50%;"| 
 Belfast – Kenneth Branagh
 Don't Look Up – Screenplay by Adam McKay; Story by Adam McKay and David Sirota
 King Richard – Zach Baylin
 Licorice Pizza – Paul Thomas Anderson
 The Worst Person in the World – Eskil Vogt and Joachim Trier
| style="vertical-align:top; width:50%;"| 
 CODA – Sian Heder; based on the original motion picture screenplay La Famille Bélier written by Victoria Bedos, Thomas Bidegain, Stanislas Carré de Malberg and Éric Lartigau Drive My Car – Ryusuke Hamaguchi and Takamasa Oe; based on the short story by Haruki Murakami
 Dune – Jon Spaihts, Denis Villeneuve and Eric Roth; based on the novel by Frank Herbert
 The Lost Daughter – Maggie Gyllenhaal; based on the novel by Elena Ferrante
 The Power of the Dog – Jane Campion; based on the novel by Thomas Savage
|-
| style="vertical-align:top; width:50%;"| 
 Encanto – Jared Bush, Byron Howard, Yvett Merino and Clark Spencer Flee – Jonas Poher Rasmussen, Monica Hellström, Signe Byrge Sørensen and Charlotte de la Gournerie
 Luca – Enrico Casarosa and Andrea Warren
 The Mitchells vs. the Machines – Mike Rianda, Phil Lord, Christopher Miller and Kurt Albrecht
 Raya and the Last Dragon – Don Hall, Carlos López Estrada, Osnat Shurer and Peter Del Vecho
| style="vertical-align:top; width:50%;"| 
 Drive My Car (Japan) in Japanese – directed by Ryusuke Hamaguchi Flee (Denmark) in Danish – directed by Jonas Poher Rasmussen
 The Hand of God (Italy) in Italian – directed by Paolo Sorrentino
 Lunana: A Yak in the Classroom (Bhutan) in Dzongkha – directed by Pawo Choyning Dorji
 The Worst Person in the World (Norway) in Norwegian – directed by Joachim Trier
|-
| style="vertical-align:top; width:50%;"| 
 Summer of Soul (...Or, When the Revolution Could Not Be Televised) – Ahmir "Questlove" Thompson, Joseph Patel, Robert Fyvolent and David Dinerstein Ascension – Jessica Kingdon, Kira Simon-Kennedy and Nathan Truesdell
 Attica – Stanley Nelson and Traci A. Curry
 Flee – Jonas Poher Rasmussen, Monica Hellström, Signe Byrge Sørensen and Charlotte de la Gournerie
 Writing with Fire – Rintu Thomas and Sushmit Ghosh
| style="vertical-align:top; width:50%;"| 
 The Queen of Basketball – Ben Proudfoot Audible – Matthew Ogens and Geoff McLean
 Lead Me Home – Pedro Kos and Jon Shenk
 Three Songs for Benazir – Elizabeth Mirzaei and Gulistan Mirzaei
 When We Were Bullies – Jay Rosenblatt
|-
| style="vertical-align:top; width:50%;"| 
 The Long Goodbye – Aneil Karia and Riz Ahmed Ala Kachuu – Take and Run – Maria Brendle and Nadine Lüchinger
 The Dress – Tadeusz Łysiak and Maciej Ślesicki
 On My Mind – Martin Strange-Hansen and Kim Magnusson
 Please Hold – K.D. Dávila and Levin Menekse
| style="vertical-align:top; width:50%;"| 
 The Windshield Wiper – Alberto Mielgo and Leo Sánchez Affairs of the Art – Joanna Quinn and Les Mills
 Bestia – Hugo Covarrubias and Tevo Díaz
 Boxballet – Anton Dyakov
 Robin Robin – Dan Ojari and Mikey Please
|-
| style="vertical-align:top; width:50%;"| 
 Dune – Hans Zimmer Don't Look Up – Nicholas Britell
 Encanto – Germaine Franco
 Parallel Mothers – Alberto Iglesias
 The Power of the Dog – Jonny Greenwood
| style="vertical-align:top; width:50%;"| 
 "No Time to Die" from No Time to Die – Music and lyrics by Billie Eilish and Finneas O'Connell "Be Alive" from King Richard – Music and lyrics by DIXSON and Beyoncé Knowles-Carter
 "Dos Oruguitas" from Encanto – Music and lyrics by Lin-Manuel Miranda
 "Down to Joy" from Belfast – Music and lyrics by Van Morrison
 "Somehow You Do" from Four Good Days – Music and lyrics by Diane Warren
|-
| style="vertical-align:top; width:50%;"| 
 Dune – Mac Ruth, Mark Mangini, Theo Green, Doug Hemphill and Ron Bartlett Belfast – Denise Yarde, Simon Chase, James Mather and Niv Adiri
 No Time to Die – Simon Hayes, Oliver Tarney, James Harrison, Paul Massey and Mark Taylor
 The Power of the Dog – Richard Flynn, Robert Mackenzie and Tara Webb
 West Side Story – Tod A. Maitland, Gary Rydstrom, Brian Chumney, Andy Nelson and Shawn Murphy
| style="vertical-align:top; width:50%;"| 
 Dune – Production Design: Patrice Vermette; Set Decoration: Zsuzsanna Sipos Nightmare Alley – Production Design: Tamara Deverell; Set Decoration: Shane Vieau
 The Power of the Dog – Production Design: Grant Major; Set Decoration: Amber Richards
 The Tragedy of Macbeth – Production Design: Stefan Dechant; Set Decoration: Nancy Haigh
 West Side Story – Production Design: Adam Stockhausen; Set Decoration: Rena DeAngelo
|-
| style="vertical-align:top; width:50%;"| 
 Dune – Greig Fraser Nightmare Alley – Dan Laustsen
 The Power of the Dog – Ari Wegner
 The Tragedy of Macbeth – Bruno Delbonnel
 West Side Story – Janusz Kamiński
| style="vertical-align:top; width:50%;"| 
 The Eyes of Tammy Faye – Linda Dowds, Stephanie Ingram and Justin Raleigh Coming 2 America – Mike Marino, Stacey Morris and Carla Farmer
 Cruella – Nadia Stacey, Naomi Donne and Julia Vernon
 Dune – Donald Mowat, Love Larson and Eva von Bahr
 House of Gucci – Göran Lundström, Anna Carin Lock and Frederic Aspiras
|-
| style="vertical-align:top; width:50%;"| 
 Cruella – Jenny Beavan Cyrano – Massimo Cantini Parrini and Jacqueline Durran
 Dune – Jacqueline West and Robert Morgan
 Nightmare Alley – Luis Sequeira
 West Side Story – Paul Tazewell
| style="vertical-align:top; width:50%;"| 
 Dune – Joe Walker Don't Look Up – Hank Corwin
 King Richard – Pamela Martin
 The Power of the Dog – Peter Sciberras
 Tick, Tick... Boom! – Myron Kerstein and Andrew Weisblum
|-
| colspan="2" style="vertical-align:top; width:50%;"| 
 Dune'' – Paul Lambert, Tristan Myles, Brian Connor and Gerd Nefzer
 Free Guy – Swen Gillberg, Bryan Grill, Nikos Kalaitzidis and Dan Sudick
 No Time to Die – Charlie Noble, Joel Green, Jonathan Fawkner and Chris Corbould
 Shang-Chi and the Legend of the Ten Rings – Christopher Townsend, Joe Farrell, Sean Noel Walker and Dan Oliver
 Spider-Man: No Way Home – Kelly Port, Chris Waegner, Scott Edelstein and Dan Sudick
|}

Governors Awards
The Academy held its 12th annual Governors Awards ceremony on March 25, 2022, during which the following awards were presented:

Honorary Academy Awards
 Samuel L. Jackson  "Whose dynamic performances resonate across genres and generations of audiences worldwide."
 Elaine May  "Writer, director, performer, pioneer whose bracing comedic spark illuminates us all."
 Liv Ullmann  "For her deeply affecting screen portrayals and lifelong commitment to exploring the human condition."

Jean Hersholt Humanitarian Award
 Danny Glover  "For [his] decades-long advocacy for justice and human rights reflects his dedication to recognizing our shared humanity on and off the screen."

Films with multiple nominations and awards

Presenters and performers
The following individuals, listed in order of appearance, presented awards or performed musical numbers.

Ceremony information

In October 2021, the Academy hired film director and producer Will Packer and his production company chief of staff Shayla Cowan to oversee production of the 2022 ceremony. "Will is a powerhouse producer who has enjoyed success across all movie genres! He's already bringing a boundless energy and a focus on innovation to this year's Oscars, to entertain the widest spectrum of fans. Many wonderful surprises ahead," remarked Academy president David Rubin and CEO Dawn Hudson. In response, Packer expressed his gratitude, saying: "The power, the beauty, the romance of the imagery in movies has always attracted me. I'm fully embracing the challenge of bringing an ode to one of the most iconic mediums in the world to life. What an honor." Four months later, actresses and comediennes Regina Hall, Amy Schumer, and Wanda Sykes were announced as hosts of the gala during an interview with Packer on Good Morning America. This marked the first time that three people had shared hosting duties for the Oscars since Chevy Chase, Goldie Hawn, and Paul Hogan presided over the 59th ceremony held in 1987.

This year, the show was centered around the theme "Movie Lovers Unite". In an interview with the Los Angeles Times, Packer explained his reasoning behind the theme, stating: "Some are movie lovers who have seen every single one of the nominated movies, and they've got very specific opinions about who wins. And then you have people who are just casual moviegoers, who perhaps have not seen the awards fare but who also love movies. I'm inviting them in as well. They're just as important to me as a viewer. And I think we can have a show that does both. We can walk and chew gum at the same time." In tandem with the theme, several people from different backgrounds, such as firefighters and healthcare workers, participated in the nominations announcement. DJ Khaled introduced the hosts at the beginning of the telecast, and athletes Tony Hawk, Kelly Slater, and Shaun White introduced a montage saluting the 60th anniversary of the James Bond film franchise.

Also tying in with the ceremony's theme of "Movie Lovers Unite", the Academy teamed up with Twitter to host an "Oscars Fan Favorite" contest, where Twitter users could vote for their favorite film of the year and their favorite movie moment. The contest drew a predominantly negative reaction from Academy members, with some comparing it to the "Popular Film" category initially proposed for the 91st ceremony held in 2019, and others viewing it as an attempt to recognize Spider-Man: No Way Home and its box office performance. Ultimately, Army of the Dead was named the Oscars Fan Favorite, while the Oscars Cheer Moment went to Zack Snyder's Justice League for "The Flash Enters the Speed Force". According to TheWrap, the most active voters were autonomous web programs, although the Academy denied this claim.

The festivities marked their return to the Dolby Theatre after a one-year absence due to the COVID-19 pandemic. In compliance with Los Angeles County health and safety standards, AMPAS announced that attending nominees and guests would need to show proof of vaccination or a valid medical exemption, and two negative PCR tests, in order to attend. Presenters and performers underwent "rigorous testing" but were not required to be vaccinated. Audience members in sections closest to the stage were seated further apart but were not required to wear face masks. Masks were required for attendees in the mezzanine. Additionally, the annual Governors Awards was held on March 25, two days before the main ceremony, after previously being postponed from its original January 15 date due to concerns due to health and safety concerns related to the SARS-CoV-2 Omicron variant.

Production designer David Korins designed a new stage for the show. Music producer and songwriter Adam Blackstone served as musical director for the telecast and conductor for the orchestra, which featured musicians Travis Barker, Sheila E., and Robert Glasper. Rapper D-Nice served as an in-house DJ during the gala. As part of a continued focus on enhancing inclusion and accommodations for disabilities, the Academy offered a live feed of American Sign Language (ASL) interpretation for the ceremony through the Academy Awards' YouTube channel.

Rule and eligibility period changes
In June 2020, the Academy announced that, starting with the 94th awards, a fixed number of ten films would once again be nominated for Best Picture. According to The Hollywood Reporter, this rule change was initiated in order "to maximize the diversity of the films that are nominated for the Academy's highest honor" as part of the organization's Academy Aperture 2025 equity and inclusion initiative. Previously, AMPAS had experimented with a ten-film Best Picture slate for two years beginning with the 82nd ceremony in 2010 before changing the rules two years later so that a fluctuating number of films would be nominated depending on the nomination voting results.

Due to continued concerns stemming from the COVID-19 pandemic, the Academy decided once again to allow films that were released via video on demand or streaming to be eligible for the awards on the condition that said films were originally scheduled to have a theatrical release prior to the start of the pandemic. However, only feature films released during the ten-month period in 2021 from March 1 to December 31 would be eligible for awards consideration.

Removal of categories from the broadcast
The presentations and acceptance of eight awards (Best Animated Short Film, Best Documentary Short Subject, Best Film Editing, Best Live Action Short Film, Best Makeup and Hairstyling, Best Original Score, Best Production Design, and Best Sound) were not broadcast live but instead pre-taped an hour before the start of the telecast, in an attempt to "allow more time for comedy, film clips and musical numbers", and to shorten the ceremony; a similar move had been attempted for the 91st Academy Awards in 2019 but had been reversed after being negatively received. The decision was reportedly made under pressure from ABC executives, who had initially demanded that 12 categories be moved off the live broadcast, under the possible penalty of not airing the ceremony at all. Josh Brolin and Jason Momoa presented the awards off the air.

The move was quickly met with significant backlash. Following the announcement, Steven Spielberg said: "All of us are on the same line bringing the best of us to tell the best stories we possibly can. And that means for me we should all have a seat at the supper table together live at 5." More than 70 prominent film professionals—including Guillermo del Toro, James Cameron, Jane Campion, Denis Villeneuve, and John Williams—issued a letter urging the Academy to reverse the plan, which they argued would relegate some nominees to "the status of second-class citizens". Addressed to Academy President David Rubin, the letter claimed that the decision would do "irreparable damage" to the Oscars' reputation by "demeaning the very crafts that, in their most outstanding expressions, make the art of filmmaking worthy of celebration". Best Actress nominee (and eventual winner) Jessica Chastain decided to skip the red carpet and other press to ensure she was in the theater during the Makeup and Hairstyling category to support the team who worked with her on The Eyes of Tammy Faye, stating: "The most important thing for me is to honor the incredible artisans who work in our industry." Sound engineer Tom Fleischman and production sound mixer Peter Kurland resigned from the Academy in protest of the new policy.

Will Smith–Chris Rock slapping incident

During the presentation for Best Documentary Feature, actor Will Smith walked onstage and assaulted presenter and comedian Chris Rock over a joke about the former's wife, Jada Pinkett Smith. Rock remarked: "Jada, I love you. G.I. Jane 2, can't wait to see it," referencing the 1997 film G.I. Jane in which Demi Moore's character wears her hair in a buzz cut. Pinkett Smith was diagnosed with alopecia in 2018 and shaved her head due to the condition. The joke was ad-libbed by Rock and not part of his scripted remarks. After initially laughing, Smith rose from his seat near the stage, walked up to Rock, slapped him, and returned to his seat. Rock said: "Will Smith just smacked the shit out of me." After Smith returned to his seat, he shouted to Rock, twice: "Keep my wife's name out your fucking mouth!" Rock calmly replied: "I'm going to, okay?" to Smith and joked that it was the "greatest night in the history of television" before presenting the award. Commentators noted that although Rock appeared to fumble his subsequent lines, he maintained his composure in the midst of chaos.

An Academy librarian said the altercation was likely the first incident of on-stage violence in Academy Awards history. In the United States, ABC muted the audio due to federal broadcast profanity regulations; however, many international broadcasters use a clear feed and did not censor it, and uncensored recordings of the event went viral on social media. About forty minutes later, Smith won the award for Best Actor for his portrayal of Richard Williams in King Richard. He focused his speech on his need to protect those around him and apologized to the Academy and to the other nominees, but not to Rock; he received a standing ovation. The Economist described his acceptance speech, in which he appealed to God calling on him to do "crazy things" in the name of love, as "dangerous, self-serving cant".

Many celebrities expressed shock, disappointment, and outrage over the incident. The show's production team decided not to remove Smith from the theater, due to time constraints and the desire to avoid another disruption. Rock did not file a police report over the incident. The day after the ceremony, the Academy released a statement condemning Smith's actions and announced an internal review. The same day, Smith formally apologized to Rock, the Academy, the Williams family, and the cast and crew of King Richard in Instagram and Facebook posts; he described his behavior as "unacceptable and inexcusable". Smith later announced his resignation from the Academy on the Friday following the gala. One week later, the Board of Governors banned Smith from all Academy events, including the Academy Awards, for ten years effective that day.

Critical reviews
Television critic Daniel Fienberg of The Hollywood Reporter wrote: "After a fairly promising first hour, the show had begun to flag in basically the same ways Oscar telecasts always flag, proving conclusively that producer Will Packer's attempt to fix the event was barely a Band-Aid." He concluded by stating: "The 94th Academy Awardswhich should have provided either a pleasant distraction from a world starting to emerge from a pandemic or the opportunity for advocacy relating to Russia's invasion of Ukraine and discriminatory laws being passed around the countrywill just be remembered as a moment of toxic awfulness and subsequent infection." Variety columnist Caroline Framke quipped: "No matter how desperately ABC and the Academy wanted the ceremony to be a well-oiled machine, this year's Oscars proved the power of live TV, for better and for deeply uncomfortable worse." Kelly Lawler of USA Today commented that despite the attempts by AMPAS and broadcaster ABC to shorten the ceremony while making it more entertaining for viewers at home, remarking: "It was equal parts boring and terrifying, cringe-worthy and interminable."Los Angeles Times television critic Lorraine Ali said: "Overall, the production was much tighter and brighter than in recent years, thanks in large part to powerful music numbers, a diverse mixture of guests, and the bitingly funny trio of hosts, Wanda Sykes, Amy Schumer and Regina Hall." Film critic Richard Roeper of the Chicago Sun-Times praised the hosts' performances, writing: "It was funny, albeit relatively safe stuff." He also noted that despite the Smith–Rock incident disrupting the momentum of the proceedings, the telecast was "one of the most uplifting, groundbreaking, amazing Oscars ever".

Ratings and reception
The American telecast on ABC drew in an average of 16.62 million people over its length, which was a 60% increase from the previous year's ceremony. The show also earned higher Nielsen ratings compared to the previous ceremony with 9.0% of households watching the ceremony. In addition, it garnered a higher 18–49 demo rating with a 3.76 rating, or 77% viewers in that demographic. In July 2022, the broadcast was nominated for three awards at the 74th Primetime Emmys, but it failed to win any of its nominations.

"In Memoriam"
The "In Memoriam" tribute, accompanied by a musical medley performed by musical group The Samples, paid tribute to the following individuals.

 Sidney Poitier – actor, director
 Olympia Dukakis – actress
 William Hurt – actor
 Stephen Sondheim – composer
 Halyna Hutchins – cinematographer
 Ned Beatty – actor
 Peter Bogdanovich – actor, director, writer
 Clarence Williams III – actor
 Chris Huvane – talent manager
 Michael K. Williams – actor
 Jerome Hellman – producer
 Jean-Paul Belmondo – actor
 David H. DePatie – producer
 Martha De Laurentiis – producer
 Irwin W. Young – film laboratory executive, producer
 Sally Kellerman – actress
 Richard Donner – director
 Ivan Reitman – director, producer
 Emi Wada – costume designer
 Yvette Mimieux – actress
 Sonny Chiba – actor, martial artist
 Lina Wertmüller – director, writer
 Douglas Trumbull – visual effects, director, producer
 Brian Goldner – producer
 Robert Blalack – visual effects supervisor
 Felipe Cazals – director, writer
 Saginaw Grant – actor
 Jon Gregory – film editor
 Dorothy Steel – actress
 Dean Stockwell – actor
 Melvin Van Peebles – director, producer, writer, actor
 Alan Ladd Jr. – producer, executive
 David Brenner – film editor
 Don Phillips – casting director, producer
 Bill Taylor – visual effects supervisor, cinematographer
 Norman Lloyd – actor
 Ruthie Tompson – animator
 Brad Allan – stunt performer, stunt coordinator
 Mikis Theodorakis – composer
 Max Julien – actor, writer, producer
 Lewis Erskine – film editor
 Tony Walton – production designer, costume designer
 Steve Schapiro – photographer
 Mace Neufeld – producer, talent manager
 Carmen Salinas – actress
 Paul Mooney – comedian, actor, writer
 Betty White – actress
 Marilyn Bergman – lyricist
 Leslie Bricusse – songwriter, writer
 Marcia Nasatir – executive producer
 Buddy Van Horn – stunt performer, stunt coordinator, director
 Diane Weyermann – producer, executive
 Jane Powell – actress, singer
 Jean-Marc Vallée – director, producer, writer, film editor
 Charles Grodin – actor

During the montage, actors Tyler Perry, Bill Murray, and Jamie Lee Curtis eulogized Poitier, Reitman, and White, respectively. Furthermore, a moment of silence was observed at the end of Reba McEntire's performance of Best Song nominee "Somehow You Do" in light of the Russian invasion of Ukraine.

See also
 List of submissions to the 94th Academy Awards for Best International Feature Film

Notes

References

External links
 
 
 Oscars Channel at YouTube (run by the Academy of Motion Picture Arts and Sciences)

News resources
 Oscars 2022 at BBC News
 Oscars 2022 at The Guardian''

Other resources
 

2021 film awards
2021 awards in the United States
2022 awards in the United States
2022 in Los Angeles
March 2022 events in the United States
Academy Awards ceremonies
Television shows directed by Glenn Weiss
Impact of the COVID-19 pandemic on cinema